A two-part referendum was held in Hungary on 5 December 2004.

Questions
Voters were asked two questions:

Both measures were approved by voters, but the referendum failed due to a voter turnout of 37.5%.

Results

Question I

Question II

References

2004 referendums
2004 in Hungary
Referendums in Hungary